Shah Ghouse Café is a popular hotel located in Shalibanda, Tolichowki, Raidurgam Biodiversity Hyderabad, Telangana, India. It became popular for its Hyderabadi haleem in a short time. The restaurant is also for its other Hyderabadi delicacies like the biryani, Paya etc.

The Restaurant
The restaurant’s proprietors are Mohammad Rabbani, Mohammad Ghouse Pasha and Mohammad Irfan.

Shah Ghouse hotel and restaurant near lbnagar junction is at all related to shah ghouse cafe of shalibanda or toli chowki.

References

Restaurants in Hyderabad, India
Year of establishment missing